The 2012 Senior League World Series took place from August 12–18 in Bangor, Maine, United States. Guatemala City, Guatemala defeated Lemon Grove, California in the championship game.

Teams

Results

Group A

Group B

Elimination Round

References

Senior League World Series
Senior League World Series
2012 in sports in Maine